Constitution High School (nickname Con High) is a college preparatory high school located in Center City Philadelphia, Pennsylvania. It is the first history based high school in Pennsylvania. It was founded September 2006 by Dr. Thomas Davidson. About 290 attend grades 9 through 12. It is located in close proximity to Independence Mall in Philadelphia. Constitution High School has a strong relationship with the National Constitution Center, as well as partnerships with the Gilder Lehrman Institute of American History and Philadelphia law firm, Ballard Spahr LLP.

History

Constitution High School was founded in 2006 by Dr. Thomas Davidson, as a partnership between the Philadelphia School District, the National Constitution Center, Ballard Spahr LLP, and the Gilder Lehrman Institute of American History. Constitution High School is a college preparatory, citywide admission school located in the heart of Philadelphia’s Historic District, and is the only law, democracy, and history themed high school in the Philadelphia School District and well as the state of Pennsylvania. Constitution has a classroom that is designed as a courtroom.

References

High schools in Philadelphia
Educational institutions established in 2006
2006 establishments in Pennsylvania
Market East, Philadelphia